Rechytsa District, Rečycki Raion is a district in Gomel Region, Belarus. Its administrative center is Rechytsa.

Notable residents 
 Yury Zakharanka (1952, Vasilyevichy town – 1999), Belarusian Minister of Internal Affairs and opposition politician disappeared in 1999
 Uladzimir (Vladimir) Yarets (b. 1941, Karavacičy), round-the-world traveler

References

External links
  Official site
  Official site

 
Districts of Gomel Region